Thomas Robert Shannon Broughton, FBA (17 February 1900 – 17 September 1993) was a Canadian classical scholar and leading Latin prosopographer of the twentieth century. He is especially noted for his definitive three-volume work, Magistrates of the Roman Republic (1951-1986).

Life and career
Broughton was born in 1900 in Corbetton, Ontario. He attended Victoria College at the University of Toronto. There he received a B.A. in 1921 with honors in classics. He earned his M.A. in 1922. After studying at the University of Chicago, he was made a Rogers Fellow at Johns Hopkins University, where he received a Ph.D. in Latin in 1928, having studied under the famed ancient historian Tenney Frank (1876-1939).

He began his teaching career at Victoria College, Toronto.  Broughton would go on to teach at Amherst College, Bryn Mawr College (1928-1965) and, later, serve as George L. Paddison Professor of Latin at the University of North Carolina at Chapel Hill (1965-1971), where the Library Epigraphy Room, created at his behest, remains a seminal resource. Although he retired from UNC in 1971 (then aged 71), he would continue to work and advise students until his death in 1993.

In 1931, he married Annie Leigh Hobson Broughton of Norfolk, Virginia. They had two children, Margaret Broughton Tenney and T. Alan Broughton (b. 1936), a poet and pianist and professor emeritus of the University of Vermont. Mrs. Broughton died on September 19, 2005, in Charleston, South Carolina.

Magistrates of the Roman Republic
Broughton's main scholarly work was his massive, three-volume Magistrates of the Roman Republic (commonly abbreviated MRR), published 1951 to 1986 and requiring more than 30 years to complete. The project provides an unparalleled accounting of the names of men elected to office during the Roman Republic and has become a standard reference work.  It provides a year-by-year list of all known office-holders, including not only the magistracies of the cursus honorum from consul to quaestor, but also promagistracies and military commands in the provinces, legates (both official and ad hoc), military prefects, priesthoods, and special commissions. Each entry is documented with ancient sources and selected works of modern scholarship. An index by name, listing each man's known offices, appears in volume 2.

In 1953 the Magistrates of the Roman Republic was recognized with the Charles J. Goodwin Awards of Merit from the American Philological Association.

Achievements and awards
Broughton's career included a variety of academic appointments and awards: visiting professor at Johns Hopkins University, Simon F. Guggenheim Memorial Foundation Fellow, holder of a Fulbright research grant to Italy and professor in charge of the School of Classical Studies of the American Academy in Rome.

Broughton served as president of the American Philological Association and as vice president of the International Federation of Societies of Classical Studies for 10 years. He was a member of the American Philosophical Society, a fellow of the American Academy of Arts and Sciences, an honorary member of the Society for the Promotion of Roman Studies, a corresponding member of the German Archaeological Institute and a corresponding Fellow of the British Academy. Three universities awarded him honorary LL.D. degrees: Johns Hopkins University in 1969, the University of Toronto in 1971 and UNC in 1974.

After Broughton's death in September 1993, a Colloquium was organised for November 1994 at the University of North Carolina at Chapel Hill in honour of his memory. The  papers delivered on this occasion, including those by eminent scholars such as T.P. Wiseman, Erich S. Gruen, and Ernst Badian, later formed the basis of the honorific volume Imperium Sine Fine: T. Robert S. Broughton and the Roman Republic, edited by J. Linderski.

Works
[dissertation] The Romanization of Africa Proconsularis (1929, reissued 1968).
1936. "Was Sallust Fair to Cicero?" Transactions and Proceedings of the American Philological Association 67:34-46.
Magistrates of the Roman Republic (1951-1986).
1934. "Roman Landholding in Asia Minor." Transactions and Proceedings of the American Philological Association 65:207-239.
"Roman Asia Minor", in Tenney Frank, An Economic Survey of Ancient Rome IV (1938)
1946. "Notes on Roman Magistrates. I. The Command of M. Antonius in Cilicia. II. Lucullus' Commission and Pompey's Acta." Transactions and Proceedings of the American Philological Association 77:35-43.
1991. "Candidates Defeated in Roman Elections: some ancient Roman 'also-rans'" Transactions of the American Philological Association 81.4: 1-64.

Students
 1969. Packard, Jane. Official Notices in Livy’s Fourth Decade: Style and Treatment. Ph.D., Department of Classics, University of North Carolina at Chapel Hill.
 1969. Wade, Donald W. The Roman Auxiliary Units and Camps in Dacia. Ph.D., Department of Classics, University of North Carolina at Chapel Hill
 1971. Houston, George W. Roman Imperial Administrative Personnel During the Principates of Vespasian and Titus (AD 69-81). Ph.D., Department of Classics, University of North Carolina at Chapel Hill.
 1973. Goldsberry, Mary. Sicily and its Cities in Hellenistic and Roman Times. Ph.D., Department of Classics, University of North Carolina at Chapel Hill.
 1974. Harrison, James Geraty. The Official Priests of Rome in the Reigns of Trajan and Hadrian. Ph.D., Department of Classics, University of North Carolina at Chapel Hill.

References

Sources
 Jerzy Linderski in BDNAC pp. 64–66.
 George W. Houston in J. Linderski (ed.), Imperium Sine Fine: T. Robert S. Broughton and the Roman Republic (1996) pp. 1–30, 35–42.
 Brennan, T. Corey, T. Alan Broughton, Ryan C. Fowler, Andrew G. Scott and Kathleen J. Shea (edd.). Autobiography: A scholar's life by T. R. S. Broughton (1900-1993). Piscataway, N.J.: Gorgias Press, 2008 (American Journal of Ancient History, n.s., vol. 5 2006 [2008]).

External links
 
Volume 1 of The Magistrates of the Roman Republic, hosted by Hathi Trust Digital Library

Canadian classical scholars
American classical scholars
Corresponding Fellows of the British Academy
Prosopographers of ancient Rome
1900 births
1993 deaths
Classical scholars of Johns Hopkins University
Classical scholars of Bryn Mawr College
Classical scholars of the University of North Carolina at Chapel Hill
20th-century Canadian historians